Giovanni Battista Cavalcaselle (22 January 1819 – 31 October 1897) was an Italian writer and art critic, best known as part of "Crowe and Cavalcaselle", for the many works in English on art history he co-authored with Joseph Archer Crowe.  Their multi-volume A New History of Painting in Italy continued to be revised and republished until 1909, after both were dead. Though now outdated, these are still often cited by modern art historians.

Biography
Cavalcaselle was born in Legnago, Veneto. He studied at the Academy of Fine Arts in Venice. Cavalcaselle participated in the Revolution of 1848 and in the Roman Republic, and was sentenced to death in absentia. After the fall of the republic he lived in England for several years. There he published, together with Joseph A. Crowe, their first joint work, Early Flemish Painters (1856), later followed by the History of Painting in Italy (3 volumes, 1864-1866).  Other important works by Crowe and Cavalcaselle are The Life of Titian (London, 1876), and The Life of Raphael (London, 1883).

He worked as a consultant on acquisitions to the National Gallery, London.  By the late 1850s he was able to revisit Rome.  In 1867 he was made inspector of the Bargello museum in Florence. He returned to Rome in 1875 to become the chief of the art department at ministerial level under the Minister of Public Instruction, until 1893.

Publications
With Crowe:

Titian: his Life and Times (in two volumes, 1877)
Raphael: his Life and Works (in two volumes 1883-5)

Notes

References
 "Dictionary": Biography from the Dictionary of Art Historians

1819 births
1897 deaths
People from Legnago
Italian biographers
Male biographers
Italian male non-fiction writers
Italian art critics
19th-century Italian people
19th-century journalists
Male journalists
19th-century Italian male writers